Cooper Green Mercy Health Services is owned by Jefferson County, Alabama. It first opened as Mercy Hospital in 1972 as a 319-bed acute care facility and was renamed for former Birmingham mayor Cooper Green three years later. It is located at 1515 6th Avenue South, adjacent to UAB Hospital on Birmingham's Southside. After four decades, the hospital closed its inpatient beds on December 31, 2012, and transitioned to a multi-specialty outpatient health service organization. The health service organization offers both primary and specialty care, behavioral health, and urgent care. In addition, it offers an onsite pharmacy, radiology, and clinical laboratory, as well as OT, PT, Speech and Respiratory Therapy. Consistent with its mission, the health service organization continues to offer healthcare to the citizens of Jefferson County regardless of their ability to pay.

Funding for indigent care was established by the Alabama Legislature in 1965, using revenues collected from county sales and liquor taxes. As a county-owned health service organization, Cooper Green Mercy provides healthcare services to all Jefferson County residents with fees based on family size and income. The health service organization coordinates with the University of Alabama at Birmingham (UAB) Health System, one of the nation's leading academic medical centers, as a training site for medical residents and to provide patients with diagnostic tests and procedures not provided onsite. In addition, many of the specialty clinics are staffed by UAB faculty who practice part-time at the facility. Through this partnership, Cooper Green Mercy Health Services' patients, most of whom are low income or economically-challenged, are able to receive not just comprehensive healthcare services, but world class healthcare.

From October 2005 to March 2008 the physical plant underwent a $28 million program of extensive renovations and modernization of systems. Brasfield & Gorrie was general contractor for the project.

In May 2009, Birmingham mayor Larry Langford suggested that the city of Birmingham take over operation of the hospital, predicting that the county would try to shut it down amid cost-cutting measures in the wake of a massive County debt crisis. Indeed, Jefferson County, Alabama, did file for voluntary relief under Chapter 9 of the United States Bankruptcy Code on November 9, 2011. His concerns proved unfounded, however. While the County Commission did vote 3 to 2 on August 28, 2012, to close the inpatient portion of the facility that it contended had been subsidized for years from the County's General Fund, Cooper Green Mercy Health Services continues to provide comprehensive outpatient care to the County's most vulnerable citizens.

Mercy Hospital served as a symbol of a long and hard-fought battle for healthcare equality and racial dignity in Jefferson County, Alabama. The efforts of so many who went before have not been forgotten. Cooper Green Mercy Health Services continues this legacy into the 21st century.

References
 Velasco, Anna (July 15, 2007) "Renovation transforming look of county hospital." Birmingham News
 Bryant, Joseph (May 19, 2009) "Mayor Larry Langford: Birmingham should consider operating Cooper Green Mercy Hospital." Birmingham News

External links
 Cooper Green Mercy Hospital website

Hospital buildings completed in 1972
Buildings and structures in Birmingham, Alabama
1972 establishments in Alabama